Two ships of the Royal Navy have borne the name HMS Advice Prize. The name indicates the ships were taken as prizes by ships named Advice, and subsequently commissioned into the navy:

  was a sloop captured from the French in 1693 and sold in 1695.
  was an 18-gun sixth rate captured from the French in 1704 and sold in 1712.

See also
 

Royal Navy ship names